The Manado yellow tiger (Parantica menadensis) is a species of nymphalid butterfly in the Danainae subfamily. It is endemic to Sulawesi, Indonesia.

References

 

Parantica
Butterflies of Indonesia
Endemic fauna of Indonesia
Fauna of Sulawesi
Taxonomy articles created by Polbot
Butterflies described in 1883